The Dominion Exhibition was an exhibition held annually in Canada from 1879 to 1913.  Every year the federal government awarded the role of host of the exhibition to one of the country's larger fairs.   

The first exhibition was held in Ottawa in 1879, and the final exhibition was held in Brandon, Manitoba in 1913.  The outbreak of the First World War meant no exhibition was held in 1914, and the event was not revived after the war.

The "Dominion Exhibition Display Building II" in Brandon, a wooden building purpose-built for the 1913 exhibition, was designated a National Historic Site of Canada in 1999 as it is the only known surviving building constructed for the Dominion Exhibition.

Exhibitions

1879 - Ottawa, Ontario
1880 - Montreal, Quebec
1881 - Halifax, Nova Scotia
1883 - Saint John, New Brunswick, held in commemoration of the 100th anniversary of the arrival of the Loyalists
1884 - Montreal, Quebec
1885 - London, Ontario
1903 - Toronto, Ontario
1904 - Winnipeg, Manitoba
1905 - New Westminster, British Columbia
1906 - Halifax, Nova Scotia 
1907 - Sherbrooke, Quebec
1908 - Calgary, Alberta
1910 - Saint John, New Brunswick
1911 - Regina, Saskatchewan
1912 - Ottawa, Ontario
1913 - Brandon, Manitoba

References

Exhibitions in Canada
Recurring events established in 1879
Recurring events disestablished in 1914
1879 establishments in Canada
1914 disestablishments in Canada